The Virginia Tech Hokies women's soccer team began in 1980 with two club teams under the guidance of Everett Germain and his two daughter's Betsy and Julie. Virginia Tech's women's soccer became a college soccer program that competes in NCAA Division I in 1993. The team played in the A-10 and the Big East before moving to the Coastal Division of Atlantic Coast Conference in 2014. The team has advanced to the NCAA Women's soccer tournament nine times.  Their best appearance is reaching the semifinals in 2013.  Their home games are played at Sandra D. Thompson Field.

History

1990s
The Virginia Tech Hokies women's soccer team began play under coach Sam Okpodu in 1993.  The team had a respectable first season, finishing 6–10–1.  The team began play without a conference.  A small improvement followed in the team's second season.  The Hokies finished with a record of 8–11–0.  In 1995 the Hokies would begin play in the Atlantic 10 Conference, where the school was a member in other sports.  The move proved difficult, with the Hokies finishing 3–12–3 overall, and 1–3–1 in their first conference season.  However, improvement quickly followed, with the team achieving a .500 record in overall play and a winning record in conference play in 1996.  The team won nine games in each season from 1996 to 1999.  Their loss record was remarkably consistent as well, with the Hokies losing nine games from 1996 to 1998 and ten in 1999.

2000s
The decade of the 2000s started in a very similar fashion with the team going 9–10–0.  In 2000, the team did not participate in a conference as the university transitioned into joining the Big East Conference.  2001 would be the team's first season in the Big East, and prove a difficult one.  The Hokies finished 8–9–3 overall, but 1–8–1 in conference play.  After the season, Sam Okpodu would leave as head coach to pursue an opportunity with the Nigerian National Team.  Jerry Cheynet would switch from the men's team head coach to coach the women's team. In his only season as head coach, the team would finish 6–11–1 and 2–4 in conference play.  Kelly Cagle would take over as the programs third head coach in program history in 2003.  She would achieve a 9–9 record in her first season.  2004 would prove to be a turning point year for the Hokies.  First, the school joined the Atlantic Coast Conference.  In their first year in the ACC, the team would achieve their first winning season in program history, finishing 11–9–0.  Additionally, they would qualify for their first postseason, qualifying for both the ACC Tournament and the NCAA Tournament.  The 2004 postseason qualification was not followed up until 2008.  The team posted losing records in 2005 and 2006.  Despite a 8–7–3 record in 2007, the Hokies did not qualify for either tournament.  In 2008, the Hokies were runners up in the ACC Tournament, their best finish in program history.  They also began a run of qualifying for 8 straight NCAA tournaments in 2008.  The decade closed with a program best for wins, with 16.  The previous record was 2004, with 11.  The Hokies also achieved only their second winning conference record in 2009.

2010s
The decade would start with the Hokies continuing to qualify for the ACC and NCAA tournaments, and winning double digit games.  2010 marked the third straight year the Hokies achieved each of those milestones.  However, after the season coach Kelly Cagle resigned to relocate her family to the Southwest.  Charles Adair was hired as her replacement.  Adair had been the associate head coach for the past 5 years at Virginia Tech.  Adair would pick up where Cagle left off.  In his first season, the Hokies won 14 games, and finally broke through the first round of the NCAA tournament.  The team would reach the Sweet 16 for the first time in program history.  In 2012, the Hokies finished 4–5–1 in conference play for the third straight year.  This record was good enough to qualify for the ACC Tournament in the previous two years, but was not good enough in 2012.  However, the team did make another NCAA Tournament appearance.  2013 was arguably the best season in program history.  The Hokies set a program record for wins, with 19, finished as runner up in the ACC Tournament and reached the Semifinals of the NCAA Tournament.  Their 9 conference wins are a program record by 3 wins.  The Hokies couldn't repeat the heights of 2013 in 2014.  The team finished with 16 wins, and notched another NCAA Sweet 16 appearance, but their 5–5 ACC record was not good enough to qualify for the tournament.  This was in part because the ACC reduced the tournament size to 4 teams instead of 8.  2015 saw the Hokies win total drop by 1, to 15.  They lost in the second round of the NCAA Tournament and missed the ACC Tournament despite a 6–3–1 conference record.  2016 would end a run of 8 straight NCAA appearances.  The Hokies did finish with a winning record of 11–5–3, but had a sub par 3–4–3 conference record.  The Hokies endured a disappointing 2017 where they went 1–5–4 in conference play.  2018 proved to be a rebound, with the team qualifying for the ACC and NCAA tournaments after a two-year hiatus.  The Sweet 16 appearance in the NCAA tournament was their best result since 2014.

2020s 
The decade started with a season shortened by the COVID-19 pandemic.  The team played a shortened out of conference schedule and only eight games in the ACC.  They finished seventh, and lost in the First round of the ACC Tournament.  In 2021 the team returned to a more normal conference schedule and posted a 12–6–2 overall record, and went 5–3–2 in ACC play to finish in eighth place.  The ACC tournament only invited 6 teams, so they did not qualify.  They reached the Round of 32 in the NCAA Tournament.  In 2022, the Hokies finished 10–6–2 overall and 4–5–1 in ACC play to finish in eighth place again.  The did earn an at-large invitation to the NCAA Tournament, but lost in the First Round.  Their qualification marked the fourth time in five years that the team qualified for the NCAA Tournament.

Personnel

Roster

Team management

Seasons

† In 1995 the Hokies began play in the Atlantic 10 Conference.
‡ In 2001 the Hokies began play in the Big East Conference.
^ In 2004 the Hokies began play in the Atlantic Coast Conference.

Notable alumni

Current Professional Players
  Chandler McDaniel (2016–2017) - Currently with Philippines national team
  Mandy McGlynn (2016–2019) - Currently with Piteå IF
  Nicole Kozlova (2017–2021) - Currently with HB Køge
  Emily Gray (2018–2021) – Currently with North Carolina Courage

References

External links
 
 2018 Record Book

 
Soccer clubs in Virginia
NCAA Division I women's soccer teams